Hernando Pizarro Leongómez (1959 - 25 February 1995 in Bogotá) was a Colombian Narcoguerrilla, not only known for being the brother of the commander of the 19th of April Movement (M-19) Carlos Pizarro Leongómez but as the second in command of the Ricardo Franco Front.

Gustavo Sastoque was condemned for his assassination, but apparently he was utilized as a scapegoat by members of the FARC

References 

1959 births
1995 deaths
Members of FARC
Colombian guerrillas